A norry or nori (from the French word for lorry) was an improvised rail vehicle service from Cambodia. Lonely Planet describes it as "Cambodia's bamboo train". The rest of the network, originally built by the French colonial government, is largely abandoned, after the Khmer Rouge regime effectively shut it down. In 2006 the BBC reported that there was only one scheduled service a week and it ran at not much more than walking pace. 

By October 2017 the bamboo train was no longer available in the original form due to the resumption of rail service between Poipet and Phnom Penh. However, the bamboo train was rebuilt near Wat Banan in order to cater to the local tourism industry. The relocated site opened in the middle of January 2018.

Origins

Norries had low fares, and were frequent and relatively fast, so they were popular despite their rudimentary design, lack of brakes, the state of the rails (often broken or warped) and the lack of any formal operating system.  Its simple construction and light weight means that a norry could be easily removed from the track – if two meet on the line, the one with the lighter load is removed from the rails and carried round the other. At the end of the line the vehicle would be lifted and turned. In August 2016, Norry has been developed with braking system.

There was precedent for the Norry's popularity. In the 1980s and 1990s, due to the civil war in Cambodia, trains were led by an armed and armoured carriage; the first carriages of the train were flatbeds used as mine sweepers, and travel on these was free for the first carriage and half-price for the second. These options were popular despite the obvious risks.

Norry construction is a cottage industry conducted in trackside villages. It takes around four days to construct one of the vehicles, which have a steel frame overlaid with bamboo slats resting on wheels taken from abandoned tanks. Fuel was bought from villages along the route, supplied in glass jars and the flat-bedded vehicles will carry any load that will fit, including people, livestock, motorcycles and rice.

In May 2011 the bamboo train was the only train operating around the Battambang area, which could be observed by the completely overgrown tracks passing through the city. On the outskirts a tourist service operates for $5 per person to a village that has a brick factory. This was overseen by the local Tourist Police. Some families run small shops here where you can buy a cold drink or a "Ride the Battambang Bamboo train" t-shirt.

As late as January 2014 there was still a bamboo train ride in Pursat, which led southeast out of the city for about an hour for a fare of 20,000 ៛ riels (US$5) per person.

Current Operations 
The line starts near the base of Phnom Banan -- a hill that houses an Angkorian temple -- and ends  down the line at Chhoeuteal commune. Despite concerns that the new bamboo train was no longer 'authentic' and that it was located too far from town, it has been credited with increasing tourism for the province, with Battambang welcoming 670,000 tourists in -- an 8% increase -- in 2018.

See also
 Rail transport in Cambodia
 Railroad speeder
 Draisine
 Taiwanese push car railways

References

External links
Norry Train Station on OpenStreetMap

Rolling stock
Rail transport in Cambodia
Articles containing video clips